Defending champions Adrian Quist and Don Turnbull defeated John Bromwich and Jack Harper 6–2, 9–7, 1–6, 6–8, 6–4, to win the men's doubles tennis title at the 1937 Australian Championships.

Seeds

  Adrian Quist /  Don Turnbull (champions)
  Jack Crawford /  Vivian McGrath (semifinals)
  Arthur Huxley /  Len Schwartz (quarterfinals)
  Harry Hopman /  Abel Kay (quarterfinals)

Draw

Draw

References

External links
  Source for seedings and the draw

1937 in Australian tennis
Men's Doubles